Sega Worldwide Soccer is a series of soccer games by Sega. The series was first launched for the Sega Saturn and later moved to the Dreamcast. The games were released between 1995 and 2000.

History
Sega Worldwide Soccer, produced by Sega themselves, was a launch game for the Sega Saturn's North American release. It was preceded by International Victory Goal, one of the debut titles of the console. The game featured international teams and league, play-off and tournament modes. Although it used fictional player names (due to the lack of a license), the non-volatile memory of the Saturn allowed editing of names. The team kits were as close to the official 1996 kits as possible. The game was the top-rated football game until International Superstar Soccer 64 was released one year later. Worldwide Soccer was later ported to the PC.

One year later Sega Worldwide Soccer 98 was released, again for the Saturn. This version featured (still unlicensed) clubs from England, Spain and France, two new stadiums and the same free-flowing gameplay. US international Cobi Jones appears on the cover of the American version.

One final title, Sega Worldwide Soccer 2000, appeared on the Dreamcast. However, instead of being developed in-house, Silicon Dreams (who previously worked with Eidos on the UEFA Champions League series and also World League Soccer) was given the rights to produce a game bearing the Worldwide Soccer name. An update titled Sega Worldwide Soccer 2000: Euro Edition (capitalizing on the popularity of Euro 2000) was released on the Dreamcast in Europe.

Games

Reception
GamePro gave Worldwide Soccer a positive review, commenting that "Not since FIFA amazed 3DO owners has another soccer game looked so good and played so well." They particularly praised the graphics, zooming camera, and the demanding gameplay, though they did criticize the "magnetic" dribbling and passing as being less realistic than the dribbling and passing in 3DO FIFA. Out of 5, they gave it ratings of 5 for graphics, 4 for sound, 4.5 for control, and 4.5 for fun factor.

See also
 Wave Master
 List of J. League licensed video games

References

External links
 Sega Worldwide Soccer '98: Club Edition at SegaSaturn.co.uk
 SEGA Worldwide Soccer / Victory Goal series at MobyGames

Association football video games
Sega Games franchises
 
Video game franchises introduced in 1995